Last Days of Mussolini (Italian: Mussolini: Ultimo atto) is a 1974 Italian historical drama film co-written and directed by Carlo Lizzani and starring Rod Steiger, Franco Nero and Lisa Gastoni. The film depicts the days leading up to the death of Benito Mussolini, the Italian dictator, when he attempted to flee Milan in April 1945 at the end of World War II in Europe.

Plot summary

In 1945, Benito Mussolini goes to Milan to talk with Archbishop Alfredo Ildefonso Schuster to request his help in escaping from Italy. The Republic of Salò, the last bastion of fascism, is decaying, and the Americans, along with the partisans are about to win control of Milan. Mussolini flees, pursued by his lover Claretta Petacci, and manages to get to the northern village of Dongo. There he clashes with the Germans, who order him to disguise himself as an officer of Germany rather than be captured by the partisans. Mussolini accepts without objection, always hoping for a revolt of his loyal fascists, but they are in jeopardy. When Mussolini is recognised, Walter Audisio, the leader of the partisans, initially wants to hand him over to the Americans, so that Mussolini undergoes due process. But the war crimes of the Duce are too great, so Audisio makes the decision to shoot him in front of the Villa Belmonte in the village of Giulino, along with his female companion.

Cast
 Rod Steiger as Benito Mussolini
 Franco Nero as Walter Audisio, alias 'Valerio'
 Lisa Gastoni as Claretta Petacci
 Lino Capolicchio as Pierluigi Bellini delle Stelle, alias 'Pedro'
 Henry Fonda as Cardinal Alfredo Ildefonso Schuster
 Giuseppe Addobbati as Raffaele Cadorna, Jr.
 Bruno Corazzari as Lt. Fritz Birzer
 Giacomo Rossi Stuart as Jack Donati
 Rodolfo Dal Pra as Rodolfo Graziani
 Manfred Freyberger as Otto Kisnat

Bibliography 
 Angelo Paratico: Ben. Mursia, 2010.

References

External links
 

1975 films
1970s biographical drama films
1970s Italian-language films
English-language Italian films
Films directed by Carlo Lizzani
Films about Benito Mussolini
Films scored by Ennio Morricone
Italian biographical drama films
1974 drama films
1974 films
1975 drama films
1970s Italian films